United Nations Security Council resolution 732, adopted without a vote on 23 January 1992, after examining the application of the Republic of Kazakhstan for membership in the United Nations, the Council recommended to the General Assembly that Kazakhstan be admitted.

See also
 Member states of the United Nations
 List of United Nations Security Council Resolutions 701 to 800 (1991–1993)

References

External links
 
Text of the Resolution at undocs.org

 0732
1992 in Kazakhstan
 0732
 0732
January 1992 events